In scholarship, a secondary source is a document or recording that relates or discusses information originally presented elsewhere. A secondary source contrasts with a primary source, which is an original source of the information being discussed; a primary source can be a person with direct knowledge of a situation or a document created by such a person. 

A secondary source is one that gives information about a primary source. In this source, the original information is selected, modified and arranged in a suitable format.  Secondary sources involve generalization, analysis,  interpretation, or evaluation of the original information. 
 
The most accurate classification for any given source is not always obvious.  Primary and secondary are relative terms, and some sources may be classified as primary or secondary, depending on how they are used. A third level, the tertiary source, such as an encyclopedia or dictionary, resembles a secondary source in that it contains analysis, but attempts to provide a broad introductory overview of a topic.

Classification
Information can be taken from a wide variety of objects, but this classification system is only useful for a class of sources that are called symbolic sources.  Symbolic sources are sources that are intended to communicate information to someone.  Common symbolic sources include written documents such as letters and notes, but not, for example, bits of broken pottery and scraps of food excavated from a midden, regardless of how much information can be extracted from an ancient trash heap, or how little can be extracted from a written document.  

Many sources can be considered either primary or secondary, depending on the context in which they are used. Moreover, the distinction between primary and secondary sources is subjective and contextual, so that precise definitions are difficult to make. For example, if a historical text discusses old documents to derive a new historical conclusion, it is considered to be a primary source for the new conclusion, but a secondary source of information found in the old documents. Other examples in which a source can be both primary and secondary include an obituary or a survey of several volumes of a journal counting the frequency of articles on a certain topic.

Whether a source is regarded as primary or secondary in a given context may change, depending upon the present state of knowledge within the field. For example, if a document refers to the contents of a previous but undiscovered letter, that document may be considered "primary", since it is the closest known thing to an original source, but if the letter is later found, it may then be considered "secondary".

Attempts to map or model scientific and scholarly communication need the concepts of primary, secondary and further "levels". One such model is the UNISIST model of information dissemination. Within such a model, these concepts are defined in relation to each other, and the acceptance of this way of defining the concepts are connected to the acceptance of the model.

Some other modern languages use more than one word for the English word "source". German usually uses  ("secondary literature") for secondary sources for historical facts, leaving  ("secondary source") to historiography. A  is a source which can tell about a lost  ("primary source"), such as a letter quoting from minutes which are no longer known to exist, and so cannot be consulted by the historian.

Science, technology, and medicine
In general, secondary sources are self-described as review articles or meta-analysis.

Primary source materials are typically defined as "original research papers written by the scientists who actually conducted the study." An example of primary source material is the Purpose, Methods, Results, Conclusions sections of a research paper (in IMRAD style) in a scientific journal by the authors who conducted the study. In some fields, a secondary source may include a summary of the literature in the introduction of a scientific paper, a description of what is known about a disease or treatment in a chapter in a reference book, or a synthesis written to review available literature. A survey of previous work in the field in a primary peer-reviewed source is secondary source information. This allows secondary sourcing of recent findings in areas where full review articles have not yet been published.

A book review that contains the judgment of the reviewer about the book is a primary source for the reviewer's opinion, and a secondary source for the contents of the book. A summary of the book within a review is a secondary source.

Library and information science

In library and information sciences, secondary sources are generally regarded as those sources that summarize or add commentary to primary sources in the context of the particular information or idea under study.

Mathematics 

An important use of secondary sources in the field of mathematics has been to make difficult mathematical ideas and proofs from primary sources more accessible to the public; in other sciences tertiary sources are expected to fulfill the introductory role.

Humanities and history
Secondary sources in history and humanities are usually books or scholarly journals, from the perspective of a later interpreter, especially by a later scholar. In the humanities, a peer reviewed article is always a secondary source.
The delineation of sources as primary and secondary first arose in the field of historiography, as historians attempted to identify and classify the sources of historical writing.  In scholarly writing, an important objective of classifying sources is to determine the independence and reliability of sources. In original scholarly writing, historians rely on primary sources, read in the context of the scholarly interpretations.

Following the Rankean model established by German scholarship in the 19th century, historians use archives of primary sources. Most undergraduate research projects rely on secondary source material, with perhaps snippets of primary sources.

Law
In the legal field, source classification is important because the persuasiveness of a source usually depends upon its history. Primary sources may include cases, constitutions, statutes, administrative regulations, and other sources of binding legal authority, while secondary legal sources may include books, the headnotes of case reports, articles, and encyclopedias. Legal writers usually prefer to cite primary sources because only primary sources are authoritative and precedential, while secondary sources are only persuasive at best.

Family history
"A secondary source is a record or statement of an event or circumstance made by a non-eyewitness or by someone not closely connected with the event or circumstances, recorded or stated verbally either at or sometime after the event, or by an eye-witness at a time after the event when the fallibility of memory is an important factor." Consequently, according to this definition, a first-hand account written long after the event "when the fallibility of memory is an important factor" is a secondary source, even though it may be the first published description of that event.

Autobiographies
An autobiography can be a secondary source in history or the humanities when used for information about topics other than its subject. For example, many first-hand accounts of events in World War I written in the post-war years were influenced by the then prevailing perception of the war, which was significantly different from contemporary opinion.

See also
Original research

References

Further reading
 Jules R. Benjamin, A Student's Guide to History (2013) 
 Edward H. Carr, What is History? (Basingstoke: Palgrave, 2001) 
 Wood Gray, Historian's handbook, a key to the study and writing of history (Prospect Heights, IL: Waveland Press, 1991, ©1964) 
 Derek Harland, A Basic Course in Genealogy: Volume two, Research Procedure and Evaluation of Evidence (Bookcraft Inc, 1958) WorldCat record
 Richard Holmes, Tommy (HarperCollins, 2004) 
 Martha C. Howell and Walter Prevenier, From Reliable Sources: An Introduction to Historical Methods (2001) 
 Richard A. Marius and Melvin E. Page, A Short Guide to Writing About History (8th Edition) (2012) 
 Hayden White, Metahistory: the historical imagination in nineteenth-century Europe (Baltimore: Johns Hopkins University Press, 1973) 

Library science terminology
Information science
 
Historiography
 
History resources